Stolen Kisses is a 1968 French romantic comedy-drama film directed by François Truffaut, starring Jean-Pierre Léaud, Delphine Seyrig and Claude Jade. It continues the story of the character Antoine Doinel, whom Truffaut had previously depicted in The 400 Blows (1959) and the short film Antoine and Colette (1962). In this film, Antoine begins his relationship with Christine Darbon, which is depicted further in the last two films in the series, Bed & Board (1970) and Love on the Run (1979).

The original French title of the film comes from a line in Charles Trenet's song "Que reste-t-il de nos amours ?" which is also used as the film's signature tune. The film was nominated for Academy Award for Best Foreign Language Film.

The film begins with a pan onto the locked gates of the Cinémathèque Française, then based at the Palais de Chaillot. On the gates there is a sign 'Relache' ('Closed'). This is Truffaut's reference to the Affaire Langlois when the head of the Cinémathèque had been fired by the French government. He was eventually reinstated after filmmakers such as Truffaut used all their wiles to foment protest.

Plot
There are many continuations from The 400 Blows; discharged from the army as unfit, Antoine Doinel seeks out his sweetheart, violinist Christine Darbon. He has written to her voluminously (but, she says, not always nicely) while in the military. Their relationship is tentative and unresolved. Christine is away skiing with friends when Antoine arrives, and her parents must entertain him themselves, though glad to see him. After she learns that Antoine has returned from military service, Christine goes to greet him at his new job as a hotel night clerk. It is a promising sign that perhaps this time, the romance will turn out happily for Antoine. He is, however, quickly fired from the hotel job. Counting the army, Antoine loses three jobs in the film, and is clearly destined to lose a fourth, all symbolic of his general difficulty with finding his identity and "fitting in".

Later, Christine attempts to guess Antoine's third job, amusingly tossing out guesses like sheriff or water taster. Finally, his job as a private detective is revealed. Throughout the film, Antoine works to maintain the job, working a case that requires him to pose as a shoe store stock boy. The job separates Antoine from his relationship with Christine. Soon, he falls for his employer's attractive (and older) wife, who willingly seduces him. He quarrels with Christine, saying he has never "admired" her. Fired from the detective agency, by the film's end, Antoine has become a TV repairman. He still avoids Christine, but she wins him back by deliberately (and simply) disabling her TV, then calling his company for repairs while her parents are away. The company sends Antoine, who is once again bumbling and inept, trying for hours to fix a TV with just one missing tube. Morning finds the two of them in bed together.

The film's final scene shows the newly engaged Antoine and Christine, strolling in the park. A strange man who has trailed Christine for days approaches the couple and declares his love for Christine. He describes his love as "permanent" and unlike the "temporary" love of "temporary people". When he walks away, Christine presumes that the man is insane. Antoine, recognising similarities in much of his own previous behaviour, admits, "He must be".

Cast

References to other Truffaut films
 Early in the film, Doinel can be seen reading a French translation of the 1947 William Irish (Cornell Woolrich) novel Waltz into Darkness, the source of Truffaut's next film, Mississippi Mermaid.
 In the first scene, Doinel reads Le Lys dans la vallée (The Lily in the Valley). It is another of Balzac's books. 
 The character Colette Tazzi and her husband Albert make a brief cameo appearance. She chides Doinel for not contacting her, saying he did not used to be "afraid of the telephone". This is a reference to the plot of the 1962 Antoine and Colette.

Critical response
Stolen Kisses was well-reviewed by critics all over the world. In an enthusiastic review for The New York Times (4 March 1969), Vincent Canby commented:

Danny Peary called it "François Truffaut's witty, sad, insightful meditation on Love, encompassing passion, courtship, confusion, conflict, romance, jealousy, disloyalty, dishonesty, sex, conquest, and commitment (and second thoughts)."

Awards and nominations

See also
 List of submissions to the 41st Academy Awards for Best Foreign Language Film
 List of French submissions for the Academy Award for Best Foreign Language Film

References

External links
 
 
 
 Stolen Kisses – an essay by Andrew Sarris at The Criterion Collection

1968 films
1968 comedy-drama films
1968 romantic comedy films
1960s French-language films
1960s romantic comedy-drama films
Antoine Doinel
Color sequels of black-and-white films
Films directed by François Truffaut
Films set in Paris
Films shot in Paris
Films with screenplays by François Truffaut
French romantic comedy-drama films
French sequel films
Louis Delluc Prize winners
1960s French films